This is a list of airports in Nepal, sorted by location.

The oldest of the country's three international airports, and the hub of air services in the country, is Tribhuvan International Airport, which serves the nation's capital and the country's largest metropolitan city of Kathmandu.  Gautam Buddha International Airport, situated at the birth-place of Gautam Buddha (i.e. Lumbini), is the second international airport to operate in Nepal. Pokhara International Airport, located at the heart of tourism in Pokhara city, is the third international airport to operate in Nepal. A fourth International Airport i.e.  Nijgadh International Airport is in the final phase of planning and its construction will start soon.



International Airports 
 Gautam Buddha International Airport, Siddharthnagar

 Pokhara International Airport, Pokhara

 Tribhuvan International Airport, Kathmandu

All Airports 

Airport names shown in bold indicate the airport has scheduled service on commercial airlines.

Future Airports

Former Airports

See Also 

 Transport in Nepal
 List of airports by ICAO code: V#VN - Nepal
 Wikipedia:WikiProject Aviation/Airline destination lists: Asia#Nepal
 regional aviation chart

References 

 Civil Aviation Authority of Nepal (CAAN)
Nepal Facts: Airports in Nepal
 Nepal Domestic Flight Ticketing
 
  - includes IATA codes
 Great Circle Mapper: Airports in Nepal - IATA and ICAO codes
 World Aero Data: Nepal - ICAO codes and coordinates
 Pilot Friend dot Com & Google Earth used to find misplaced airports and make more accurate airport locations, where there was no Official CAAN location to be found.

Nepal
 
Airports
Airports
nepal
airports